Harry Andrew Simmons (born 25 November 1997) is an English rugby union scrum half or wing who plays for Leicester Tigers in Premiership Rugby.  Born in Norwich Simmons first played rugby for Gresham’s School and Holt RFC in Norfolk before gaining experience at Loughborough Students. His regular playing positions are scrum half and Wing.

Simmons made his Leicester Tigers debut at scrum half on 4 November 2017 against Gloucester in the Anglo-Welsh Cup at Welford Road, the next week against Bath he moved to full back.  He made his Champions Cup debut in France against Castres in January and scored his first two tries for Leicester in the Anglo-Welsh Cup game against Wasps at the Ricoh Arena on 4 February 2018.

On 7 July 2021 Simmons joined Jersey Reds on a season long loan arrangement.  Simmons scored a hat trick on 19 March 2022 again Coventry.  Simmons re-newed his Leicester contract on 12 May 2022.

References

1997 births
Living people
Leicester Tigers players
Jersey Reds players
People educated at Gresham's School
Rugby union scrum-halves
English rugby union players
Rugby union players from Norwich